Kim Hyeok (born 10 August 1995, Seoul) is a Korean equestrian athlete. He competed at the Asian Games in 2018, where he won team silver and individual bronze in dressage.

References

1995 births
Living people
South Korean male equestrians
Sportspeople from Seoul
Equestrians at the 2018 Asian Games
Asian Games medalists in equestrian
Medalists at the 2018 Asian Games
Asian Games silver medalists for South Korea
Asian Games bronze medalists for South Korea